The Missouri–Iowa–Nebraska–Kansas League, known informally as the "MINK" League, was a Class D level minor league baseball league that played from 1910 to 1913. The Missouri–Iowa–Nebraska–Kansas League consisted of teams based in the four states, but not always at the same time. The Missouri–Iowa–Nebraska–Kansas League permanently folded midway through the 1913 season.

Today, the M.I.N.K. Collegiate Baseball League, a collegiate summer baseball league has adopted the M.I.N.K. moniker.

History
In 1910, the Missouri–Iowa–Nebraska–Kansas League began play as a six–team Class D level league. The league would play four seasons. The Auburn Athletics, Falls City Colts, and Nebraska City Forresters franchises all played for the duration of the league. Although the league was named the Missouri-Iowa-Nebraska-Kansas League, the four states were never represented in the league at the same time. Missouri and Iowa were represented in 1910–1911 and Kansas was represented in 1912.

The Missouri–Iowa–Nebraska–Kansas League presidents were T.A. Wilson (1910–1911), Frederick Carey (1911) and Warren Cummings (1912–1913).

In the first season for the league, the Falls City Colts won the 1910 MINK League Championship. The Missouri–Iowa–Nebraska–Kansas League began play with six teams, based in Auburn, Nebraska (Auburn Athletics), Clarinda, Iowa (Clarinda Antelopes), Falls City, Nebraska (Falls City Colts), Maryville, Missouri (Maryville Comets), Nebraska City, Nebraska (Nebraska City Forresters) and Shenandoah, Iowa (Shenandoah Pin Rollers). Falls City had a 57–40 (.588) record under manager Bill Annis to finish 1.5 games ahead of the 2nd place Clarinda Antelopes. Falls City led the league in season attendance, drawing 14,205. The Falls City Colts also moved some Sunday home games into the state of Kansas to avoid Nebraska Sunday laws.

The Maryville Comets/Humboldt Infants were the 1911 Missouri–Iowa–Nebraska–Kansas League champions after moving during the season. The Maryville, Missouri franchise, with a 24–21 record, moved to Humboldt, Nebraska on July 10, 1911. Maryville/Humboldt finished with a 59–41 (.590) record under managers Harry Sievers and A.F. Bridges, finishing in 1st place in the standings, finishing 2.0 games ahead of the 2nd place Falls City Colts and 7.0 games ahead of the 3rd place Auburn Athletics. The MINK League did not have playoffs during its existence. The league maintained itself as a six–team league in 1911, with the Shenandoah Pin Rollers (49–51), Clarinda Antelopes (43–57) and Nebraska City Foresters (40–60) rounding out the 1911 standings.

In the last full season of league play, the 1912 Nebraska City Forresters were the Missouri–Iowa–Nebraska–Kansas League champions. Nebraska City finished with a 61–38 (.616) record to lead the 1912 standings, playing under manager Ducky Holmes in the six–team league. Nebraska City finished 1.5 games ahead of the 2nd place Falls City Colts (61–41) and 2.5 games ahead of the 3rd place Auburn A's (59–41) in the final standings. The 1912 Beatrice-Fairbury Milkskimmers (42–59) replaced the Clarinda Antelopes, who folded after the 1911 season. Beatrice–Fairbury then folded after the 1912 season, as did the Hiawatha, Kansas based Hiawatha Athletics.

On July 4, 1912, Falls City pitcher Ed Finch threw the leagues' only no–hitter in a 7–0 Falls City victory over the Hiawatha Indians.

1913 was the final season for the MINK League, as the league played only a partial season, permanently folding in June, 1913. The Missouri–Iowa–Nebraska–Kansas League began the 1913 season with four teams after the Beatrice-Fairbury Milkskimmers and Hiawatha Indians franchises did not return to play and were not replaced. The 1913 Auburn Athletics, under manager Jake Kraninger, were in 1st place with 24–8 record, 9.0 games ahead of the 2nd place Nebraska City Forresters (15–17) when the Missouri–Iowa–Nebraska–Kansas League permanently folded. On June 17, 1913, the 3rd place Falls City Colts (13–19) and 4th place Humboldt Infants (12–20) both folded, causing the entire league to disband.

Sunday laws in Nebraska were noted as a factor that impacted the success of the league. Falls City had moved Sunday home games to Kansas in order to avoid the restrictions in Nebraska. Nebraska City played their week day games at their home park and their Sunday games at the Driving Park in Beatrice, Nebraska. This was a compromise with the ministerial alliance which had protested a game on Sunday during the 1910 season. Many fans traveled by train to catch a game, as the Missouri Pacific serviced league towns.

Today, the M.I.N.K. Collegiate Baseball League, a collegiate summer baseball league has adopted the moniker as a tribute to the earlier professional league. The league began play in 2009.

Cities represented 1910–1913

Standings & statistics 1910–1913

1910 M.I.N.K. League

1911 M.I.N.K. League
Maryville moved to Humboldt July 10.

1912 M.I.N.K. League

1913 M.I.N.K. League
Falls City & Humboldt withdrew June 17, 1913 causing the league to disband.

Notable alumni

Bill Annis (1910–1911) Falls City, MGR
Ducky Holmes (1912) Nebraska City, MGR
Bill Kemmer (1910) Falls City
Les Mann (1910–1911) Nebraska City
Ray Miller (1910) Falls City
Chuck Ward (1912) Falls City
Charlie Wheatley (1911) Auburn

External links
 Baseball Reference

References

Defunct minor baseball leagues in the United States
Baseball in Iowa
Baseball leagues in Iowa
Baseball leagues in Missouri
Baseball leagues in Nebraska
Baseball leagues in Kansas
1910 establishments in the United States
1913 disestablishments in the United States
Sports leagues established in 1910
Sports leagues disestablished in 1913